Mesopotamian Arabic is a group of varieties of Arabic spoken in the Mesopotamian basin of Iraq as well as spanning into southeastern Turkey, Iran, Syria, Kuwait, and spoken in Iraqi diaspora communities.

History
Aramaic was the lingua franca in Mesopotamia from the early 1st millennium BCE until the late 1st millennium CE, and as may be expected, Mesopotamian Arabic shows signs of an Aramaic substrate. The Gelet and the Judeo-Iraqi varieties have retained features of Babylonian Aramaic.

Varieties
Mesopotamian Arabic has two major varieties: Gilit Mesopotamian Arabic and Qeltu Mesopotamian Arabic. Their names derive from the form of the word for "I said" in each variety. Gilit Arabic is a Bedouin variety spoken by Muslims (both sedentary and non-sedentary) in central and southern Iraq and by nomads in the rest of Iraq. Qeltu Arabic is an urban dialect spoken by Non-Muslims of central and southern Iraq (including Baghdad) and by the sedentary population (both Muslims and Non-Muslims) of the rest of the country. Non-Muslims include Christians, Yazidis, and Jews, until most of them left Iraq in the 1940s–1950s. Geographically, the gelet–qeltu classification roughly corresponds to respectively Upper Mesopotamia and Lower Mesopotamia. The isogloss is between the rivers Tigris and Euphrates, around Fallujah and Samarra.

During the Siege of Baghdad (1258), the Mongols killed all Muslims. However, sedentary Christians and Jews were spared and northern Iraq was untouched. In southern Iraq, sedentary Muslims were gradually replaced by Bedouins from the countryside. This explains the current dialect distribution: in the south, everyone speaks Bedouin varieties close to Gulf Arabic (continuation of the Bedouin dialects of the Arabian Peninsula), with the exception of urban Non-Muslims who continue to speak pre-1258 qeltu dialects while in the north the original qeltu dialect is still spoken by all, Muslims and Non-Muslims alike.

Dialects 
Gelet dialects include:
 Northern Mesopotamian group
 Syrian šāwi dialects (including Urfa and al-Raqqah)
 Rural dialects of northern and central Iraq.
 Central Iraqi Group
 Muslim Baghdad Arabic
 The Sunni area around Baghdad
 Southern Iraqi and Khuzestani Arabic group
 Urban dialects
 Rural dialects
 Marshland dialects of the Marsh Arabs of the Mesopotamian Marshes

Qeltu dialects include:
 Anatolian Qeltu
 Mardin dialects: Mardin and surrounding villages. Mhallami. Nusaybin and Cizre (Jews)
 Siirt dialects
 Diyarbakır dialects: Diyarbakır (Christians and Jews), Diyarbakır villages (Christians), Siverek, Çermik and Urfa (Jews)
 Kozluk–Sason–Muş dialects
 Tigris Qeltu
 Maslawi: Mosul and surrounding villages (Bahzani, Bashiqa, Ain Sifni)
 Tikrit and surroundings
 Baghdad and southern Iraq (Jews and Christians only)
 Euphrates Qeltu
 Khawetna (Syria, Iraq, Turkey)
 Deir ez-Zor
 Anah and Abu Kamal
 Hit, Iraq
 Kurdistan group (Jews only)
 Northern Kurdistan: Sandur, Iraq, Akre, Erbil, Šoš
 Southern Kurdistan: Kirkuk, Tuz Khurmatu, Khanaqin

Baghdadi Arabic is Iraq's de facto national vernacular, as about half of population speaks it as a mother tongue, and most other Iraqis understand it. It is spreading to northern cities as well. Moslawi and Baghdadi are as different as Glaswegian and Cockney: barely intelligible to one another. Other Arabic speakers cannot easily understand Moslawi and Baghdadi.

Substrate 
Mesopotamian Arabic has a Syriac-Aramaic substrate, and also shares significant influences from ancient Mesopotamian languages of Sumerian and Akkadian, as well as influences from Persian, Turkish, and Greek. Mesopotamian Arabic is said to be the most Syriac-Aramaic influenced dialect of Arabic, due to Syriac-Aramaic having originated in Mesopotamia, and spread throughout the Fertile Crescent during the Neo-Assyrian period, eventually becoming the lingua franca of the entire region before the Islamic invasions.

References

Further reading